Joaquín Muñoz Benavides (born 10 March 1999) is a Spanish footballer who plays as a left winger for SD Huesca.

Career
Born in Málaga, Andalusia, Joaquín joined Atlético Madrid's youth categories in 2015, from CD Puerto Malagueño. He made his senior debut with the reserves on 30 March 2018, coming on as a late substitute in a 3–0 Segunda División B home win against Coruxo FC.

On 3 July 2018, Joaquín signed a new contract until 2021 and was definitely promoted to the B-side. He scored his first senior goal on 14 October, netting his team's second in a 3–0 home defeat of Celta de Vigo B.

Joaquín made his professional – and La Liga – debut on 19 January 2019, coming on as a late substitute for Thomas Lemar in a 3–0 away defeat of SD Huesca. On 4 July, he signed a four-year deal precisely with the latter club, now in Segunda División.

On 22 January 2020, after being rarely used, Joaquín was loaned to fellow second division side CD Mirandés for the remainder of the season. At the club he scored his first professional goal, netting the equalizer in a 2–2 away draw against Sporting de Gijón on 9 February.

On 5 October 2020, Joaquín joined second division side Málaga CF on loan for one year.

Career statistics

References

External links

1999 births
Living people
Footballers from Málaga
Spanish footballers
Association football forwards
Association football wingers
La Liga players
Segunda División players
Segunda División B players
Atlético Madrid B players
Atlético Madrid footballers
SD Huesca footballers
CD Mirandés footballers
Málaga CF players